Abraham the Laborious (fl. 14th century) was a monk of Kiev.

He is regarded as a saint, with a feast day of 21 August at Kiev.

References
Holweck, F. G. A Biographical Dictionary of the Saints. St. Louis, MO: B. Herder Book Co. 1924.

14th-century births
Year of death missing
Ukrainian saints
Monks of Kyiv Pechersk Lavra
14th-century Christian saints